The Battle of Loma Alta took place on April 24, 1860 in the vicinity of Loma Alta in the state of Zacatecas, Mexico, between elements of the liberal army of the National Guard of San Luis Potosí and Zacatecas, under General Jose Lopez Uraga and elements of the conservative army commanded by General Romulo Diaz De La Vega during the War of Reform.

Battle 
While Miguel Miramón was developing attacked Veracruz, Jesús González Ortega was forming in the state of Durango an army to attack the states of Zacatecas and San Luis Potosí. At the same time, the liberal generals Pedro Antonio Rojas Ogazón and had mastered the state of Colima and Jalisco south, threatening the city of Guadalajara. After the victory of General Uraga in Alta Loma, San Luis Potosí took and prepared to march towards the Bajio. The battle ended as liberal victory taking prisoner to the general Rómulo Diaz de la Vega and his entire army.

References

History of Zacatecas
1860 in Mexico
Conflicts in 1860
Reform War